Sketcher was one of the earliest "natural media" raster graphics software applications. It was released in the early 1990s by the US company Fractal Design Corporation for the Apple Macintosh.

This software simulated the behavior of various types of paper and art materials such as chalk, pastels, pencils and brushes. Even though color Macintoshes existed at the time, it ran in grayscale. A rationale for this may be that, while color support existed in the computer, large grayscale monitors were considerably less expensive than color ones, with color sometimes costing three times as much for an equivalent size display. Likewise, Sketcher sold for a lower price than Painter ($99 vs. $299)

Following Sketcher, Fractal Design added color support, new features, modified the interface somewhat and released Dabbler. Sketcher was discontinued shortly afterwards.

See also
List of raster graphics editors
Comparison of raster graphics editors

External links
 Bloomberg overview of Fractal Design Corporation

Raster graphics editors